Hindu Love Gods is the only album by American band Hindu Love Gods, which was released in 1990. The album was recorded around the same time as Warren Zevon's album Sentimental Hygiene, for which Zevon had enlisted Bill Berry, Peter Buck and Mike Mills of R.E.M. as players. The musicians also recorded this set of songs, mainly cover versions of old blues tunes, reputedly during late-night drunken recording sessions, not originally intending them for release.

Track listing
"Walkin' Blues" (Robert Johnson) – 4:12
"Travelin' Riverside Blues" (Robert Johnson) – 4:02
"Raspberry Beret" (Prince Rogers Nelson) – 3:53
"Crosscut Saw" (Fred Ingrahm, Bill Sanders) – 3:06
"Junko Pardner" (Bob Shad) – 2:39
"Mannish Boy" (Bo Diddley, Melvin London, Muddy Waters) – 6:57
"Wang Dang Doodle" (Willie Dixon) – 3:51
"Battleship Chains" (Terry Anderson) – 3:06
"I'm a One-Woman Man" (Tillman Franks, Johnny Horton) – 2:16
"Vigilante Man" (Woody Guthrie) – 2:56

Personnel
Hindu Love Gods
Bill Berry – drums
Peter Buck – guitar
Mike Mills – bass guitar
Warren Zevon – vocals, guitar

Production
Niko Bolas – production, engineering
Richard Landers – engineering
Rail Jon Rogut – engineering
Andrew Slater – production
Bob Vogt – engineering

Sales chart performance

Singles

References

1990 debut albums
Albums produced by Niko Bolas
Covers albums
Giant Records (Warner) albums
Hindu Love Gods (band) albums
R.E.M.